Dark Night, and Luminous is an album by American jazz pianist Marilyn Crispell and Spanish pianist Agustí Fernández, which was recorded live in 1995 during the 2nd Festival de Música del segle XX and released on the Spanish Nova Era label.

Reception

The Penguin Guide to Jazz notes that "It is interesting to hear Crispell working with another keyboard player and to compare this with the much more muscular collaboration with Irene Schweizer. Dark Night, and Luminous is almost sentimental by comparison."

Track listing
All compositions by Crispell/Fernández except as indicated
 "Part I" – 6:47
 "Part II" – 8:16
 "Part III" – 5:00
 "Part IV" – 6:28
 "Part V" – 4:13
 "Part VI" (Agustí Fernández) – 4:30
 "Part VII" (Marilyn Crispell) – 4:24
 "Part VIII" – 11:44
 "Cançó número 6"  (Frederic Monpou) – 8:13

Personnel
Marilyn Crispell – piano
Agustí Fernández – piano

References

1998 live albums
Marilyn Crispell live albums